Sevilla de Oro Canton is a canton of Ecuador, located in the Azuay Province.  Its capital is the town of Sevilla de Oro.  Its population at the 2001 census was 5,234.

Demographics
Ethnic groups as of the Ecuadorian census of 2010:
Mestizo  91.6%
White  5.9%
Afro-Ecuadorian  1.5%
Indigenous  0.8%
Montubio  0.2%
Other  0.1%

References

Cantons of Azuay Province